Steven L. Levy is a former American state legislator who served one term in the Massachusetts House of Representatives from 2011 to 2013.

References

External links

Members of the Massachusetts House of Representatives
Living people
Year of birth missing (living people)
Place of birth missing (living people)